Kristiyan Nikolov (Bulgarian: Кристиян Николов; born 18 December 2003) is a Bulgarian footballer who plays as a forward for Sportist Svoge.

Career
Nikolov joined CSKA 1948 coming from the Levski Sofia academy. On 21 October 2020 he made his debut for the team in a cup match against FC Drenovets. 5 days later he completed his professional debut for the team in a league match against Slavia Sofia.

Career statistics

Club

References

External links
 

2003 births
Living people
Bulgarian footballers
Bulgaria youth international footballers
FC CSKA 1948 Sofia players
First Professional Football League (Bulgaria) players
Association football defenders